The Allalin Glacier is a  long glacier (2005) situated in the Pennine Alps near the Allalinhorn in the canton of Valais in Switzerland. The glacier is bordered on the west by the Allalinhorn, Rimpfischhorn and Strahlhorn. It is not to be confused with the Fee Glacier which lies on the northern flank of Allalinhorn.

See also
List of glaciers in Switzerland
List of glaciers
Retreat of glaciers since 1850
Swiss Alps

External links
Swiss glacier monitoring network

Glaciers of Valais
Glaciers of the Alps